Lenny "Boom Boom" Mancini (12 July 1919 - 29 November 2003) was an American professional boxer. He was the father of Ray Mancini, a former world champion boxer.

A native of Youngstown, Ohio, Mancini began his professional career in 1937, trained by Hall of Fame trainer Ray Arcel. In May 1941, he fought reigning NBA lightweight champion Sammy Angott in a non-title fight, losing by a close split decision. A subsequent win over Dave Castilloux established Mancini as the No. 1 contender for Angott's lightweight title.

However, shortly afterwards the United States entered World War II and Mancini was drafted, denying him the chance to fight for the championship. He started out in the Medical Corps, but was eventually reassigned as an infantryman. Mancini was wounded in Metz in 1944 and awarded the Purple Heart.

After recovering from his injuries he resumed his boxing career, now in the welterweight and middleweight divisions. However, he was unable to establish himself and retired after consecutive points losses to Harry Hurst and Rocky Castellani, with a final record of 45-12-3.

Notes

External links
 

1919 births
2003 deaths
American people of Italian descent
Boxers from Youngstown, Ohio
Lightweight boxers
Welterweight boxers
Middleweight boxers
United States Army personnel of World War II
United States Army soldiers
American male boxers